Janey is a diminutive form of the feminine given name Jane.

People with this name
Janey Buchan (1926–2012), Scottish Labour Member of the European Parliament (MEP) for the Glasgow
Janey Sevilla Callander (1846–1923), British theatre producer
Janey Canuck, pen name used by Emily Murphy (1868–1933), Canadian women's rights activist, jurist, and author
Janey Godley (born 1961), British stand-up comedian and writer
Janey Gohl (born 1956), beauty queen from St. Cloud, Minnesota, competed in the Miss USA pageant
Janey Lee Grace, (born 1960), British based singer, author, television presenter and radio disc jockey
Janey Ironside (1919–1979), former professor of fashion at the Royal College of Arts, London
Janey Jacké (born 1992), Dutch drag queen and performer
Janey Scott Lewin, pen name of Roberta Leigh (1926–2014), British author and artist

Fictional character
Brainy Janey, nickname of Mary Jane Watson in Marvel comic books
Janey Powell, friend of Lisa Simpson and recurring character in The Simpsons
Janey Harper, the middle child and only daughter of Ben Harper (My Family) and Susan Harper in the BBC sitcom My Family

See also
Janey, Virginia, a community in the United States
Janey Slaughter Briscoe Grand Opera House, historic theater in Uvalde, Texas
Janey III or USS Onyx (PYc-5), diesel coastal patrol yacht of the United States Navy during World War II
Truth and Janey, American rock band from Iowa
Jane (disambiguation)
Janney (disambiguation)

English feminine given names